Pierre Antoine Marie Crozy (1831-1903) [also called Crozy aîné—French for "elder"] was a nineteenth-century French rose breeder. He was a partner in the French firm, Avoux & Crozy, La Guillotière, Lyon, actively breeding roses from the 1850s to 1860s. From the early 1860s until his death in 1903 he was also hybridising Canna species, and introduced many hundreds of new cultivars. The largest Canna Group today is still called the Crozy Group, and many of those cultivars are still being raised.

The most famous of the cultivars introduced by Crozy was Canna 'Madame Crozy', and this was later used by both Carl Sprenger in Italy and Luther Burbank in California to cross with the species Canna flaccida to produce the first of the Italian Group Cannas.

Crozy was succeeded by his son, Michel Crozy (1871-1908).

References

Notes

Bibliography
 Burbank, Luther - How Plants Are Trained to Work for Man: Plant Breeding
 Chaté, E - Le Canna, 1866
 Cooke, I - The Gardeners Guide to Growing Canna, Timber Press, 2001
 RHS - RHS Dictionary of Gardening, 1992.
 Roll Call: The Old Rose Breeder

External links
Help me find
List of rose breeders
RHS, Canna Trial 2002
Canna News: How Crozy did it

See also
 Canna (plant)
 List of Canna cultivars
 List of Canna species
 List of Canna hybridists

French horticulturists
Rose breeders
1831 births
1903 deaths